Maghar railway station is a railway station on Lucknow–Gorakhpur line under the Lucknow NER railway division of North Eastern Railway zone. This is situated beside National Highway 28 at Maghar in Sant Kabir Nagar district in the Indian state of Uttar Pradesh.

References

Railway stations in Sant Kabir Nagar district
Lucknow NER railway division